El desprecio is a Venezuelan telenovela that was produced by RCTV in 2006. The telenovela is an adaptation of the 1991 telenovela El Desprecio written by Julio César Mármol and adapted by Ana Carolina López.

Flavia Gleske and Ricardo Álamo star as the main protagonists with Fedra López as the main antagonist. The telenovela aired on RCTV from April 26, 2006 to November 21, 2006.

Plot
Clara Inés (Flavia Gleske) is a young girl who was raised by nuns in a convent in the countryside. One day, a priest tells her that she is part of the wealthy Santamarina family and decides to go to the capital city Caracas to discover more about her origins. Along the way, she meets Raul Velandró (Ricardo Álamo), a member of the family who discovers that she is part of his family and decides to help her. But Clara Inés is not aware of the danger that awaits her on reconnecting with her family. She will be thrown into a world filled with ambition, power and money. Her aunt Pastora Lara Portillo (Fedra López) will become her worst enemy. Twenty years ago, she unsuccessfully orchestrated the death of Clara Inés and now wants to take absolute control of the Santamarina fortune  currently held by her husband Israel Huatulco (Eduardo Serrano) for her son Edilio (Nacho Huett).

Clara Inés will become target of many attacks. However, she will later on gain self-confidence and return to fulfill her mission of revenge. In her soul, the seed of contempt which were sown will blossom as its greatest strength of vengeance to repay all the damage they caused.

Cast

 Flavia Gleske as Clara Inés Santamaría
 Ricardo Álamo as Raúl Velandró Lara-Portillo
 Eduardo Serrano as Israel Santamaría
 Fedra López as  Pastora Lara-Portillo de Santamaría / Ilis Lara-Portillo
 Nacho Huett as Edilio Velandró Lara-Portillo
 Paula Bevilacqua as Ludmila Álvarez de Velandró
 Deyalit López as Lucely Linares Santamaría
 Zhandra De Abreu as  Elisa Salas
 Sandy Olivares as Manuel Jesús Malpica Santamaría
 Andrés Suárez as Gabriel Barón
 Monica Spear as Tamara Campos de Velandró
 Adolfo Cubas as Cirilo Santamaría
 Adita Riera as Octavia Santamaría
 Francis Rueda as Guillermina Albornoz (Sor Juana)
 Beatriz Vasquez as Elisenda Medina
 Leopoldo Regnault as Misael Velandró
 Alejo Felipe as Baudillio Velandró
 Gonzalo Cubero as Ambrocio Cepeda
 Carlos Arreaza as Álvaro Munderey
 Rebeca Alemán as Berenice Santamaría
 Karelys Ollarves as Zaida Castellanos
 Oscar Cabrera as Crisanto "Cris" Maldonado
 Lady Núñez as Violeta Velandró
 Abril Schreiber as Gloriana Campos
 Sthuard Rodríguez as Fabio Linares
 Donny Ochoa as Peretico
 José Ángel Ávila as Giorgio
 Juan Carlos López as Fernando
 Alfonso Medina as  Gonzalo
 Cesar Bencid as Colimodio "Pereto" Peralta
 Gabriel Blanco as Gastón Maneiro
 Jesus Cervo as Tirzo
 Antonio Cuevas as Rey Lozada
 Yaneth Flores as Estrella Peralta
 Willian Goite as Padre Atenor Oliviera
 Simón Gómez as Aquiles
 Lolimar Sánchez as Afrodita
 Oswaldo Mago as Humberto Martini
 Norma Matos as Maribel Martini
 Aracelly Prieto as Brigida Albornoz
 José Romero as Gumersindo Vargas
 Freddy Salazar as Padre Potentá
 Priscila Izquierdo as Eva Linares
 Dorinay Castillo as Fátima Linares

References

External links

Telenovela World.com

RCTV telenovelas
2006 telenovelas
Venezuelan telenovelas
2006 Venezuelan television series debuts
2006 Venezuelan television series endings
Spanish-language telenovelas
Television shows set in Caracas